"The Color of Love" is the lead single by R&B vocal group Boyz II Men from the album Full Circle.

Track listing 
 "The Color of Love"
 "The Color of Love" (Instrumental)
 "The Color of Love" (Suggested Call Out Research Hook #1)
 "The Color of Love" (Suggested Call Out Research Hook #2)

 USA Catalog No. ARPCD-5091

US Promo CD
 The Color Of Love (Radio Edit) 	4:19 	
 The Color Of Love (Instrumental) 	4:40 	
 The Color Of Love (Call Out Research Hook # 1) 	0:10 	
 The Color Of Love (Call Out Research Hook # 2) 	0:10

Music video 
Regarding the music video for "The Color of Love", Arista Records president Antonio "L.A." Reid said: "Boyz II Men have always maintained a certain mood with their music, and that couldn't be better reflected than with the theme of this clip--unity and brotherhood, a multi-cultural celebration in these difficult times", he said via a statement. "There is no better group to pull it off than these four guys".

Credits and personnel
Credits adapted from the liner notes of Full Circle.

Boyz II Men: all vocals
Babyface: writer, producer, keyboards and drum programming
Paul Boutin: recording and mixing engineer
Tim Ronaghan and Jason Dale: assistant engineers
Ivy Skoff: production coordinator

Charts

References

External links 
  / SME official channel

2002 singles
Boyz II Men songs
Songs written by Babyface (musician)
Song recordings produced by Babyface (musician)
2002 songs
Arista Records singles